Charles Albert Bernard (1876–1953) was a first-class cricketer who made 33 appearances for Somerset between 1896 and 1901.  He made his top-score of 122 in the first-innings of the 1900 County Championship match against Hampshire at the County Ground, Southampton.

Bernard first played for Somerset in a 12-a-side first-class match with Oxford University in 1896, batting in the lower order without success. He reappeared in the Somerset side in 1899 and was successful as a middle-order batsman: in his second match in the new role, he scored 79 and shared a partnership of 167 with Sammy Woods for the fifth wicket in the match against Kent.

References

External links
 
 

1876 births
1953 deaths
English cricketers
Somerset cricketers